Just like You may refer to:

Albums
 Just Like You (Allison Iraheta album) or the title song, 2009
 Just Like You (Crystal Shawanda album) or the title song, 2012
 Just Like You (Falling in Reverse album) or the title song (see below), 2015
 Just like You (Keb' Mo' album) or the title song, 1996
 Just like You (Keyshia Cole album) or the title song, 2007
 Just like You, an EP by Poster Children, 1994

Songs
 "Just Like You" (Falling in Reverse song), 2015
 "Just Like You" (Louis Tomlinson song), 2017
 "Just Like You" (Three Days Grace song), 2004
 "Just Like You", by Chromatics from Dear Tommy, unreleased (2015)
 "Just Like You", by Fergie from Double Dutchess, 2017
 "Just Like You", by Fred Wesley and the Horny Horns from Say Blow by Blow Backwards, 1979
 "Just Like You", by George Canyon from What I Do, 2008
 "Just Like You", by Hannah Montana from the Hannah Montana film soundtrack, 2006
 "Just Like You", by Ian Brown from My Way, 2009
 "Just Like You", by Jessica Mauboy from Hilda, 2019
 "Just Like You", by Joyner Lucas from 508-507-2209, 2017
 "Just Like You", by Lecrae from Rehab, 2010
 "Just Like You", by Michelle Williams from Journey to Freedom, 2014
 "Just Like You", by Ministry from Twitch, 1986
 "Just Like You", by NF from Clouds (The Mixtape), 2021
 "Just Like You", by Robbie Nevil from Day 1, 1991
 "Just Like You", by Roxy Music from Stranded, 1973
 "Just Like You", by Solange Knowles from Solo Star, 2002